The United States Nordic Combined Championships 2009 took place on October 11, 2008 in Lake Placid, New York. Johnny Spillane won the race, earning his first Nordic combined national title.

Canadian athlete Jason Myslicki, raced together with the Americans and finished in fifth place.

Results

Notes

References 
 Results on the U.S. Ski Team's website.

United States Nordic Combined Championships
2009 in Nordic combined
2009 in American sports